Van is an electoral district of the Grand National Assembly of Turkey. It elects eight members of parliament (deputies) to represent the province of the same name for a four-year term by the D'Hondt method, a party-list proportional representation system.

Members 
Population reviews of each electoral district are conducted before each general election, which can lead to certain districts being granted a smaller or greater number of parliamentary seats. Van's seat allocation has gradually increased over the last sixty years, from three seats in 1957 to eight seats today.

There are currently eight sitting members of parliament representing Van, one of which is from the governing party. Van was a district where the pro-Kurdish Peace and Democracy Party (BDP) ran independent candidates in an attempt to overcome the 10 percent national electoral threshold. Four independent candidates were elected here in 2011; two have since joined the BDP.

General elections

2011 
Elected candidates in bold

June 2015

November 2015

2018

Presidential elections

2014

References 

Electoral districts of Turkey
Politics of Van Province